Vellitor is a genus of marine ray-finned fishes belonging to the family Cottidae, the typical sculpins. These fishes are found in seawedd beds in the northwestern Pacific Ocean.

Taxonomy
Vellitor was first proposed as a genus in 1904 by the American ichthyologists David Starr Jordan and Edwin Chapin Starks with Podabrus centropomus, which had been described by Sir John Richardson in 1848 from Quelpart in the Korea Strait, as its type species. Richardson's name, Podabrus was an unavailable as a name under the ICZN as it was preoccuppied by a mammal genus, the Sminthopsis proposed by John Gould in 1845 and by a beetle genus proposed by John O. Westwood in 1838, so Jordan and Starks' name is a replacement. In 1983 a second sepcies was described, differing in the number of pectoral fin rays. The 5th edition of Fishes of the World classifies the genus Triglops within the subfamily Cottinae of the family Cottidae, however, other authors classify the genus within the subfamily Psychrolutinae of the family Psychrolutidae.

Species
There are currently two recognized species in this genus:
 Vellitor centropomus (J. Richardson, 1848)
 Vellitor minutus Iwata, 1983

Characteristics
Vellitor sculpins have no spines or cirri on the upper part of the head and they have a deep, laterally compressed body. They also have a narrow caudal peduncle.

Distribution and habitat
Vellitor sculpins are found in the northwestern Pacific Ocean around Japan and South Korea where they are demersal fishes occurring in beds of seaweed.

References

Cottinae
Taxa named by David Starr Jordan
Taxa named by Edwin Chapin Starks